Wiesław Rosocha (16 September 1945 in Sokołów Podlaski, Poland – 15 March 2020 in Warsaw, Poland) was a Polish illustrator and graphic designer. Rosocha attended Warsaw Academy of Fine Arts from 1969 to 1974.

Major awards
1981 - Special Prize for "Best Book Illustration of a Year" (Warsaw)
1985 - Gold Medal at 6th International Biennial of Posters in Lahti (Finland)
1986 - 1st Prize in Competition for the Best Children's Book of a Year (Warsaw)
1991 - Bronze Medal at International Triennial of Graphic Art in Toyama (Japan)
1992 - Gold Medal at 6th International Exhibition ADC in New York (USA)

See also
List of graphic designers
List of Polish painters
List of Polish graphic designers
Graphic design

References

External links
 Site of the Artist himself: www.rosocha.pl
 
 
 Wieslaw Rosocha - Contemporary Posters

1945 births
2020 deaths
Polish graphic designers
Polish illustrators